Vladimír Weiss (21 September 1939 – 23 April 2018) was a Czechoslovak football defender and coach. He won the Olympic silver medal for Czechoslovakia at the 1964 Summer Olympics.

Personal
Weiss' son, Vladimír Weiss, is the former head coach of Slovakia and the current head coach of Slovan Bratislava, and his grandson, Vladimír Weiss, plays for Slovan Bratislava, having also appeared in Premier League, La Liga and Serie A..

Weiss died on 23 April 2018 at the age of 78.

Honours
 ČH Bratislava
Czechoslovak First League
1958–59

 International
1964 Summer Olympics
Silver medal

References

External links
 
 
 
 
 Futbalová sága rodu Weissovcov pokračuje už treťou generáciou 

1939 births
2018 deaths
Czechoslovak footballers
Czechoslovakia international footballers
Olympic footballers of Czechoslovakia
Olympic silver medalists for Czechoslovakia
Olympic medalists in football
Footballers at the 1964 Summer Olympics
Medalists at the 1964 Summer Olympics
Association football central defenders
FK Inter Bratislava players
Slovak footballers
People from Vrútky
Sportspeople from the Žilina Region
Vladimir
FC Baník Prievidza players